Bengaluru Central (Bengaluru Lok Sabha constituency) Lok Sabha constituency is one of the 28 Lok Sabha constituencies in Karnataka state in southern India. This constituency was created in 2008 as part of delimitation. It was carved out of the Bangalore North and South Lok Sabha constituencies during 2009 Indian elections. It first held elections in 2009 and its first member of parliament (MP) was P. C. Mohan

Demographics
The Central Lok Sabha constituency is dominated by minority voters, and is challenge for candidates, with having to get the support of both linguistic and religious minorities. The constituency has around 5.5 lakh Tamil People, 4.5 lakh Muslims and about 2 lakh Christians. There is also a significant number of Marwaris and Gujaratis, especially around Chickpet and Gandhinagar suburbs. The Tamil population is concentrated around the suburbs of Shivajinagar, Ulsoor, Gandhinagar, Seshadripuram and are a deciding factor for the winning candidate.  Further, the demography of the constituency ranges from rich to middle class to slums.

Vidhan Sabha segments and serving MLAs
As of 2014, Bangalore Central Lok Sabha constituency presently comprises the following eight Legislative Assembly segments:

Members of Lok Sabha

Election results

General election 2009

General election 2014

General election 2019

Gallery

See also
 Bangalore
 List of Constituencies of the Lok Sabha

References

External links
Bangalore Central lok sabha constituency election 2019 date and schedule

Lok Sabha constituencies in Karnataka
Bangalore Urban district